Arje Nadbornik (7 October 1935 – 5 July 2008) was a Finnish wrestler. He competed in the men's Greco-Roman +97 kg at the 1968 Summer Olympics. Nadbornik was Jewish, and he represented the Finnish Jewish sports club Makkabi Helsinki.

References

External links
 

1935 births
2008 deaths
Finnish male sport wrestlers
Olympic wrestlers of Finland
Wrestlers at the 1968 Summer Olympics
Sportspeople from Helsinki
Finnish Jews